Plains game is well established in literature and conversation as the sporting hunter's generic term for all those fair-game species of antelope and gazelle which are to be found - typically in rather open plains or savanna habitats - throughout sub-Saharan Africa.  The term is all-embracing, unscientific, and rather imprecise. Impala and Thomson's gazelle are classic examples of plains game, but the term also encompasses a great range of species from the diminutive steenbok to the massive eland.

Plains game species are distinct from species of dangerous game, which generally consists of the Big 5 as well as crocodile and hippopotamus. For this reason, virtually any species of game in Africa that is not considered dangerous game may be broadly referred to as plains game.

Where the term "plains game" is used as an indication of the kind of game for which particular sporting rifle cartridges are deemed suitable, it is fair to assume that the same ammunition also performs efficiently on other ungulates occurring elsewhere in the world, such as deer.

References

Hunting